Jack C. Hays High School is a public high school located in Buda, Texas, USA and classified as a 6A high school by the University Interscholastic League.  Hays High School is the oldest existing high school in Hays CISD, but was thoroughly renovated in the 2000s.  In 2015, the school was rated "Met Standard" by the Texas Education Agency.

History
The school is named for John Coffee Hays, a frontier defender, Texas Ranger and hero to those he fought to protect. He achieved fame after leaving Texas in 1849 for California, where he became the first elected sheriff of San Francisco and helped found the city of Oakland.  Hays High School was formed by the consolidation of Buda, Kyle and Wimberley high schools in 1968.  In 1986, the Wimberley community was released from the Hays Consolidated School District and reformed Wimberley High School.  A further split occurred with the opening of Lehman High School in neighboring Kyle in the fall of 2004.

Mascot
The school mascot is a Yosemite Sam-like character dressed in the standard gray uniform of the Army of the Confederate States of America known as "Colonel Jack". While "Colonel Jack" formerly wielded dual revolvers and a confederate flag belt buckle, he is currently shown with a Texas flag in his left hand and a white flag bearing an H in his right with a script R on his belt buckle. As with other institutions which draw upon confederate imagery, Hays High School encountered controversy on and off for years before ultimately discarding the confederate flag as an official symbol in 2000 and banning it from official functions entirely in 2012, followed by retiring Dixie as a fight song in 2015 and replacing it with the school's original fight song, On, Wisconsin!.

The Rebel mascot was retired following the 2020-21 school year, with the Hawk being chosen as the new mascot beginning with the 2021-22 school year. The colors remain unchanged.

Athletics
Hays High School competes in these sports -

Cross Country, Volleyball, Football, Basketball, Powerlifting, Swimming, Soccer, Golf, Tennis, Track, Baseball & Softball.

State Titles
Volleyball -
1968(B)
Softball -
2013(4A)

Notable alumni
Donnie Joseph, Major League Baseball pitcher
Dillon Passage, Tiger King Star Joe Exotic’s recent Husband
James Rossi, Navy Football Team Captain 2006

References

External links
 

Schools in Hays County, Texas
Public high schools in Texas
1968 establishments in Texas
Educational institutions established in 1968